Europium(III) fluoride is an inorganic compound with a chemical formula EuF3.

Production 
Europium(III) fluoride can produced by reacting europium(III) nitrate and ammonium fluoride:
 Eu(NO3)3 + 3 NH4F → EuF3 + 3 NH4NO3
Europium(III) fluoride nanoparticles can be synthesized by microwave irradiation of europium(III) acetate in an ionic liquid that has tetrafluoroborate as the anion.

References

Europium(III) compounds
Fluorides
Lanthanide halides